Persoonia oleoides is a species of flowering plant in the family Proteaceae and is endemic to north-eastern New South Wales.

Description
The flowers are arranged in leaf axils or on the ends of branches, sometimes on a rachis with a dormant bud on the end, sometimes on a rachis that continues to grow into a leafy branch. Flowering occurs from January to February and the fruit is a green drupe, sometimes with purple stripes.

Taxonomy
Persoonia oleoides was first formally described in 1991 by Lawrie Johnson and Peter Weston in the journal Telopea.

Distribution and habitat
This geebung grows in forest between the upper Clarence River, the upper Macleay River and Barrington Tops in eastern New South Wales.

References

Flora of New South Wales
oleoides
Plants described in 1991
Taxa named by Lawrence Alexander Sidney Johnson
Taxa named by Peter H. Weston